Orkkuka Vallappozhum is a 1978 Indian Malayalam-language film, directed by S. Babu. The film stars Jayabharathi, Jayan, K. P. Ummer, MG Soman and Master Rajeev. The film has musical score by A. T. Ummer.

Cast
Jayabharathi 
K. P. Ummer 
M. G. Soman 
Jayan 
Master Rajeev

Soundtrack
The music was composed by A. T. Ummer with lyrics by P. Bhaskaran.

References

External links
 

1978 films
1970s Malayalam-language films